Jonas Sterner (born 13 May 2002) is a German professional footballer who plays as a midfielder for  club Holstein Kiel.

Career statistics

References

External links

2002 births
Living people
German footballers
Germany youth international footballers
Association football midfielders
2. Bundesliga players
Regionalliga players
Holstein Kiel players
Holstein Kiel II players
People from Husum
Footballers from Schleswig-Holstein